Mohamed Manssour Fofana (born 10 July 2002) is an Ivorian professional footballer who plays as a midfielder for Greek Super League club PAS Giannina.

Club career
Born in Abobo, Fofana began his career with Italian amateur club ASD Cannara. At the age of 19, he joined Veria on a 3-year contract, signing his first professional contract.

He made his debut on 21 November 2021 against Olympiacos Volos and he scored his first goal against AEL in a 1–1 away game draw.

In August 2022 he moved to PAS Giannina.

References

2002 births
Living people
Veria NFC players
PAS Giannina F.C. players
Serie D players
Super League Greece 2 players
Super League Greece players
Association football midfielders
Expatriate footballers in Italy
Ivorian expatriate sportspeople in Italy
Expatriate footballers in Greece
Ivorian expatriate sportspeople in Greece
Ivorian footballers
Ivorian expatriate footballers